Nigel Melker (born 25 January 1991) is a Dutch racing driver.

Career

Karting
Melker was born in Rotterdam. He began his motorsport career in karting in 2001, winning in the Dutch Mini Junior Cup. In 2005, he won the German Junior championship and finishing as runner-up in the European ICA Junior championship.

Formula Renault
After sitting out the 2007 season, Melker moved up to single-seaters in 2008. He participated in the Formula Renault 2.0 Northern European Cup with Van Amersfoort Racing. He finished in twelfth place in the standings with eleven point-scoring positions that gave him 120 points. He also took part in ten races of the Italian Formula Renault Championship. He finished eighteenth with 37 points.

The following season, Melker competed in both the Formula Renault 2.0 Northern European Cup and Eurocup Formula Renault 2.0 championships with MP Motorsport. He finished eighteenth in the NEC standings, taking points in all six races he contested. In the Eurocup, he took part in the first five rounds, finishing 23rd with five points for sixth place at Spa.

GP3 Series
In 2010, Melker became the first driver to join RSC Mücke Motorsport for the 2010 GP3 Series season. His team-mates were compatriot Renger van der Zande and German Tobias Hegewald. He started the season by taking the first pole position of his open-wheel racing career in the opening round at Barcelona, but in the race he was involved in an accident on the opening lap and retired. In the sprint race he started from the back and rose to fourteenth place. He took another pole in Turkey, but did not finish in the points until the final race of the season at Monza, restricting him to 23rd place in the championships.

Melker remained in GP3 with the Mücke team for the 2011 season, alongside Michael Christensen and Luciano Bacheta (who was later replaced by Daniel Mancinelli). With the benefit of a year's experience in the category, his form was much stronger and he won the first race of the season in Turkey. This gave him the early championship lead, and he took a further four podium finishes, but he ultimately slipped to third place behind the Lotus ART duo of Valtteri Bottas and James Calado after his team appeared to lose its competitive edge following mid-season testing at Barcelona.

Formula 3 Euro Series
As well as his 2011 GP3 campaign, Melker competed in the season's Formula 3 Euro Series, also with Mücke, finishing in fourth position in the drivers' standings with four wins. He finished ahead of his team-mates Felix Rosenqvist, Marco Sørensen and Facu Regalia, but was unable to consistently challenge dominant champion Roberto Merhi, his Prema Powerteam colleague Daniel Juncadella, or Signature driver Marco Wittmann.

GP2 Series
After participating in the non-championship 2011 GP2 Final with DAMS, Melker switched to Ocean Racing Technology for the 2012 season, initially alongside Jon Lancaster. With a best race finish of fourth at Silverstone, he ended the season 19th in the championship.

Formula Renault 3.5 Series
Melker made his racing début in a Formula Renault 3.5 car at Silverstone 2012, replacing César Ramos at the Lotus team. He qualified a respectable 14th for the first race and went on to take a podium at his first race at a wet racing track, finishing 3rd. He retired in the second race and was replaced by Estonian Kevin Korjus for the remainder of the season. He was the only driver in Lotus car #11 to get a podium that year.

After a disappointing season in GP2, Melker went to Formula Renault 3.5 full-time for 2013, driving for  previous year's team champions Tech 1 Racing alongside series veteran Mikhail Aleshin. Melker spent most of the season in the subtop of the championship, amassing 4 podiums and 136 points, as well as posting 2 fastest laps. His best weekend of the season was at the Red Bull Ring when he was runner-up twice behind dominant winner Marco Sørensen. He finished the season in 6th place.

Formula Acceleration 1
Unable to find a drive in Formula Renault 3.5 for 2014, Melker turned his attention elsewhere. He signed with Azerti Motorsport for the inaugural Formula Acceleration 1 season. He was competitive immediately, finishing second twice at the opening round in Portugal, before taking a double victory at Circuito de Navarra. He went on to win the drivers' championship after a victory at the Nürburgring and a double victory at Assen.

Racing record

Career summary

† – As Melker was a guest driver, he was ineligible for points.

Complete GP3 Series results
(key) (Races in bold indicate pole position) (Races in italics indicate fastest lap)

Complete Formula 3 Euro Series results
(key)

Complete GP2 Series results
(key) (Races in bold indicate pole position) (Races in italics indicate fastest lap)

Complete GP2 Final results
(key) (Races in bold indicate pole position) (Races in italics indicate fastest lap)

Complete Formula Renault 3.5 Series results
(key) (Races in bold indicate pole position) (Races in italics indicate fastest lap)

Complete Formula Acceleration 1 results
(key) (Races in bold indicate pole position) (Races in italics indicate fastest lap)

References

External links
 Official site
 Melker career statistics at Driver Database
 

1991 births
Living people
Sportspeople from Rotterdam
Dutch racing drivers
Italian Formula Renault 2.0 drivers
Formula Renault 2.0 NEC drivers
Formula Renault Eurocup drivers
Dutch GP3 Series drivers
Formula 3 Euro Series drivers
GP2 Series drivers
World Series Formula V8 3.5 drivers
MP Motorsport drivers
Van Amersfoort Racing drivers
Mücke Motorsport drivers
Jo Zeller Racing drivers
DAMS drivers
Charouz Racing System drivers
Tech 1 Racing drivers
Ocean Racing Technology drivers